The 54th Guldbagge Awards ceremony, presented by the Swedish Film Institute, honoring the best Swedish films of 2018 and took place on 28 January 2019 at Cirkus in Stockholm. The ceremony was televised by SVT, and comedian Emma Molin hosted the ceremony for the first time. The nominees were presented on 3 January 2019.

Winners and nominees 
The nominees for the 54th Guldbagge Awards were announced on 3 January 2019 in Stockholm, by the Swedish Film Institute.

Awards 

Winners are listed first and highlighted in '''boldface.

Films with multiple nominations and awards

See also 
 91st Academy Awards
 76th Golden Globe Awards
 72nd British Academy Film Awards
 25th Screen Actors Guild Awards
 24th Critics' Choice Awards
 23rd Satellite Awards
 39th Golden Raspberry Awards

References

External links 
 
Guldbaggen on Facebook
Guldbaggen on Twitter
54th Guldbagge Awards at Internet Movie Database

2019 in Swedish cinema
2018 film awards
Guldbagge Awards ceremonies
2010s in Stockholm
January 2019 events in Sweden